The Japanese Monographs, Japanese Studies on Manchuria, and Japanese Night Combat Study are three groups of publications written by Japanese officers, prepared by the Military History Section of the Headquarters, US Army Forces East, and distributed by the Office of the Chief of Military History, US Department of the Army. They have been described as: "An invaluable tool for the English-speaking audience to research Japan's version of the war [World War II] in China".

Background

Japanese Monographs
The Japanese Monographs are a series of operational histories, written by former officers of the Japanese army and navy, of Japanese actions in China during World War II. The 187 monographs were prepared under the direction of General Headquarters of the U.S. Far East Command beginning in 1945.

Much of the series was extensively revised, some of it completely rewritten, to correct errors of both English and fact, mainly in the period 1955-1960. During this period, the "Japanese Studies on Manchuria" were added.

Japanese Studies on Manchuria
"The Japanese Studies on Manchuria were prepared several years after the operational monographs and were written under the direction and guidance of the Japanese consultants of the Japanese Research Division. In general, these studies are superior to the monographs in organization, accuracy, and coverage."

Japanese Night Combat Study
In addition to editing and rewriting the monographs and Manchurian studies, the Japanese Research Division also prepared a special study on night combat as practiced by the Japanese Army. The latter was titled Japanese Night Combat Study.

List of monographs

List of studies on Manchuria

Notes

External links 
 List and summary on niehorster.org
 List with PDF monographs - pacificwarachive
 List with HTML and PDF monographs - hyperwar

Japan in World War II
Monographic series